Vladimir Vladimirovich Kavrayskiy (April 22, 1884 – February 26, 1954) was a Soviet astronomer, geodesist and cartographer.

Scientific research 

In 1939, he invented the Kavrayskiy VII projection.

Kavrayskiy produced a lifetime of scientific works devoted to the solution of navigation problems.

Namesakes 

Kavrayskiy Hills in the Antarctic are named after him.

A Dobrynya Nikitich class oceanographic research ship has been named after him.

Awards and honors 

 Two Orders of the Red Banner (1944, 1947)
 Order of the Red Banner of Labour (1944)
 Order of Lenin (1945)
 Stalin Prize, 3rd class (1952)

See also
Kavrayskiy VII projection

References

External links
Vladimir Vladimirovich Kavraysky's biography in the 'Complete Dictionary of Scientific Biography' published in 2008

1884 births
1954 deaths
20th-century Russian astronomers
People from Simbirsk Governorate
Academic staff of Kharkiv Observatory
National University of Kharkiv alumni
Stalin Prize winners
Recipients of the Order of Lenin
Recipients of the Order of the Red Banner
Recipients of the Order of the Red Banner of Labour
Russian astronomers
Russian cartographers
Russian geodesists
Russian scientists
Soviet astronomers
Soviet cartographers
Soviet geodesists
Soviet scientists